Helen Hogarth (née Golden; born 16 May 1953) is a British sprinter. She competed in the women's 200 metres at the 1976 Summer Olympics.

References

External links
 

1953 births
Living people
Athletes (track and field) at the 1976 Summer Olympics
British female sprinters
Olympic athletes of Great Britain
Scottish female sprinters
Athletes (track and field) at the 1970 British Commonwealth Games
Athletes (track and field) at the 1974 British Commonwealth Games
Athletes (track and field) at the 1978 Commonwealth Games
Commonwealth Games competitors for Scotland
Sportspeople from Edinburgh
Olympic female sprinters